Mladen Iveković (1 April 1903 – 18 December 1970) was a Croatian and Yugoslavian politician and diplomat.

Born in Zagreb, Iveković studied law at the Faculty of Law, University of Zagreb and at the School for Advanced Studies in the Social Sciences in Paris. He obtained his doctoral degree at the Zagreb University in 1928. Iveković contributed to start of publication of a number of newspapers in 1930s while serving as the secretary of the Zagreb Crafts Chamber. As a member of the Communist Party of Yugoslavia, Iveković actively organised foreign volunteers for service in the Spanish Civil War. His pseudonyms included: Ivan Mladenović, Kid, Luka Koren, Spektator, and Viator. As a member of the propaganda department of the Communist Party of Croatia (KPH), Iveković helped start Politički vjesnik in 1940 (renamed Vjesnik three years later), serving as its editor until 1945.

Iveković was arrested and taken to the Jasenovac concentration camp in January 1942. He was released in September, together with the 4th Secretary of the Communist Party of Croatia Andrija Hebrang in a prisoner exchange. Iveković was elected into the Executive Council of the Anti-Fascist Council for the National Liberation of Yugoslavia (AVNOJ) at the AVNOJ's first session held in Bihać in 1942 and tasked with social policy matters. In 1943, he became the head of the propaganda service of the KPH for the region of Slavonia, and a member of the State Anti-Fascist Council for the National Liberation of Croatia (ZAVNOH). Iveković also led ZAVNOH's propaganda activities, and was a member of its legislative commission. In the 1945 Government of the People's Republic of Croatia, Iveković was appointed industry and mining minister.

After the World War II, he was elected a member of the Yugoslav constituent assembly and subsequently the member of the federal parliament for Zagreb until 1963. From 1946 to 1947, he was Yugoslav representative to the Allied Commission for World War II reparations in Bruxelles, Yugoslav ambassador to Italy in 1947–1952, and West Germany in 1952–1956 before serving as the Deputy Foreign Minister in 1956–1958. He was a member and the president of the administrative board of Tanjug Yugoslav news agency from 1958 until he retired in 1963. In 1959, he became a member of the Central Committee of the KPH. He taught at the Faculty of Political Science, University of Zagreb in 1965–1966. He died in Zagreb.

Bibliography

References

1903 births
1970 deaths
Croatian communists
Croatian people of World War II
League of Communists of Croatia politicians
People from Zagreb
Yugoslav communists